Axhausen is a surname, likely of German origin. Notable people with the surname include:
 Georg Axhausen (1877-1960), German oral and maxillofacial surgeon
 Kay Axhausen (born 1958), Swiss professor